Guk Tappeh may refer to various places in Iran:
 Guk Tappeh 1, Golestan Province
 Guk Tappeh 2, Golestan Province

See also
Gug Tappeh (disambiguation), various places in Iran